This article lists census-designated places (CDPs) in the U.S. state of Utah. At the 2010 census, there were 81 CDPs in Utah. That number dropped to 79 in 2016 when first Dutch John then Millcreek incorporated, and to 74 when five in Salt Lake County became metro townships.

Census-Designated Places

See also

 List of municipalities in Utah

References

 
Utah
Census-designated places